Wik peoples, several Australian Aboriginal groups from an extensive zone in Cape York
Wik languages
 Wik Peoples v Queensland (1996), a landmark ruling that native title can coexist with pastoral leases in Australia
 Vik, Iran, a village in Zanjan Province, Iran, also known as Wik
 Wik (film), a 2016 Peruvian thriller drama film

See also
 Wick (disambiguation)
 Wiki
 Wikipedia
 Wyck (disambiguation)